Cristian Moisescu (9 July 1946 – 7 January 2016) was a Romanian politician who served as the first Mayor of Arad of the post-communist period, being named by Civic Alliance Foundation.

References 

People from Arad, Romania
Romanian Baptists
2016 deaths
Civic Alliance Foundation politicians
1947 births
Mayors of places in Romania
20th-century Baptists
West University of Timișoara alumni